Ministry of Home Affairs Department Maharashtra is a Ministry of Government of Maharashtra. The Ministry is currently headed by Devendra Fadnavis Deputy Chief Minister.

Head office

List of Cabinet Ministers

List of Ministers of State

References

Government ministries of Maharashtra